Kelechi Udegbe is a Nigerian film actor and voice over artist. He is best known for starring as the lead character in Officer Titus. Since his screen debut in 2009, Kelechi has starred in several films and soaps including Behind The Smile, Ojuju, Taxi Driver: Oko Ashewo, Horn Free Day and Kpians: The Feast of Souls.

Filmography

Awards and nominations

See also
List of Nigerian actors

References

External links

Living people
People from Imo State
Igbo comedians
21st-century Nigerian male actors
Year of birth missing (living people)
Nigerian film actors
Nigerian voice actors